= Dorothy Langlands =

English silversmiths (1861-1905)

- Died: 1845
- Occupation: Silversmith

Dorothy Langlands (née Storey) (died 1845) was an English silversmith.

Langlands was the daughter of Charles Storey of Soho. She married John Langlands II, whose family were the most prominent silversmiths in Newcastle-upon-Tyne for sixty years. Langlands' husband died in 1804 and after his death, she registered a mark of her own, although the date of registration is unknown. Classified as both a goldsmith and a jeweler, she was active until 1814, with an address on Dean Street. She is among the best-known of the silversmiths from Newcastle-upon-Tyne; despite this, the quality of her engraving is crude.

A George III tea set crafted by Langlands between 1809 and 1812 is in the collection of the National Museum of Women in the Arts.
